The 47th edition of the annual Hypo-Meeting took place on May 28 and May 29, 2022, in Götzis, Vorarlberg (Austria). The track and field competition, featuring a men's decathlon and a women's heptathlon event was part of the 2022 World Athletics Combined Events Tour.

Men's decathlon

Records

Results

Women's heptathlon

Records

Results

References

External links 
 Official website

Hypo-Meeting
Hypo-Meeting
Hypo-Meeting
Hypo-Meeting